My Liberation Notes is a South Korean television series starring Lee Min-ki, Kim Ji-won, Son Suk-ku, and Lee El. It aired on JTBC from April 9 to May 29, 2022, every Saturday and Sunday at 22:30 (KST) for 16 episodes. It is also available for streaming on Netflix in selected regions.

Synopsis
Set in the fictional Sanpo village in Gyeonggi-do, My Liberation Notes tells the story of three siblings (Lee Min-ki, Kim Ji-won, and Lee El) and a mysterious stranger (Son Suk-ku), who want to escape from their dead-end lives.

Cast

Main
 Lee Min-ki as Yeom Chang-hee
 The second of three siblings. An employee at the headquarters of a convenience store franchise.
 Kim Ji-won as Yeom Mi-jeong
 The youngest of three siblings. A contract employee at the design department of a credit card company.
 Son Suk-ku as Mr. Gu (Gu Ja-gyeong)
 A stranger who works at the sink factory of the Yeom family, who are unaware of his real identity.
 Lee El as Yeom Ki-jeong
 The eldest of three siblings. An employee at a research company.

Supporting

People around Yeom siblings
 Chun Ho-jin as Yeom Je-ho
 Father of the three siblings.
 Lee Kyung-seong as Kwak Hye-suk
 Mother of the three siblings.
 Jeon Hye-jin as Ji Hyun-ah
 A neighborhood friend.
 Han Sang-jo as Oh Doo-hwan
 A neighborhood friend.
 Jo Min-kook as Seok Jeong-hoon
 A neighborhood friend.

People around Yeom Chang-hee
 Yang Jun-myung as Lee Min-gyu
 Yeom Chang-hee's colleague.
 Choi Bo-young as Jung Ah-reum
 Yeom Chang-hee's senior colleague.
 Jeon Soo-jin as Lee Ye-rin
 Yeom Chang-hee's ex-girlfriend.
 Oh Min-ae as Byeon Sang-mi
 A convenience store owner.

People around Yeom Mi-jeong
 Lee Ki-woo as Jo Tae-hoon
 Yeom Mi-jeong's co-worker.
 Park Soo-young as Park Sang-min
 Yeom Mi-jeong's co-worker.
 Lee Ji-hye as So Hyang-gi
 Team Leader of Joy Support Center.
 Kong Ye-ji as Han Su-jin
 Yeom Mi-jeong's colleague at the design department.
 Lee ho-young as Choi Jun-ho
 Team leader of the design department.

Others
 Jung Soo-young as Jo Kyung-sun
 Jo Tae-hoon's second sister.
 Kim Ro-sa as Jo Hee-sun
 Jo Tae-hoon's eldest sister.
 Kang Joo-ha as Jo Yu-rim
 Jo Tae-hoon's daughter.
 Kim Woo-hyung as Park Jin-u
 Director at Yeom Ki-jeong's company.
 Choi Min-chul as Mr. Baek
 Kim Min-song as Sam-sik
 Lee Shin-seong as Hyeon-jin
 Jung Won-jo as Hyuk-soo

Special appearance 
 Jung Young-joo as woman at restaurant (Ep. 15)

Production

Development
On September 24, 2021, Chorokbaem Media announced that it had signed a contract with JTBC Studios to produce and supply the series with "8 billion won worth of budget for a total of 16 episodes".

Filming
On October 5, 2021, it was reported that filming is currently in progress.

Original soundtrack

Part 1

Part 2

Part 3

Part 4

Part 5

Part 6

Part 7

Part 8

Part 9

Part 10

Part 11

Reception 
The series drew attention for its dialogues and monologues with deep metaphorical meanings, and realistic and relatable storyline. Novel concepts of "worshipping" and "liberation" brought up in the drama were well received by the audience. The series was also praised for its depiction of social pressure that captures the frustrations and challenges of young adult life in Korea.

Pierce Conran writing for South China Morning Post stated "With four intricate and distinct lead characters, terrific dialogue and a bounteous array of intimate moments for all the smaller characters in the cast, My Liberation Notes is far and away the best drama on TV right now" and gave 4.5 stars out of 5. Park Han-na of Korea Herald described the series as "a portrait of a generation trapped by the preconditions set by themselves and the society". Seo Byeong-gi of Herald Business praised the writer Park Hae-young for drama's stimulation of empathy in everyday life. During the broadcast, actor Gong Yoo on Instagram, recommended his fans to watch My Liberation Notes and after the series finished airing he left a review in his fancafe, praising its direction, screenplay and performance of actors.

Viewership
The series enjoyed modest viewership share: the first episode recorded a nationwide viewership rating of 2.9% and reached the highest rating with the last episode, which recorded the 6.7%. My Liberation Notes topped TV popularity ranking in last four weeks of its eight week run while Son Suk-ku and Kim Ji-won took first and second place respectively in drama performers popularity ranking for five consecutive weeks.

The series debuted at number nine on the Netflix's Global Top 10 for non-English television in the list issued for May 16–22, 2022, ascending to number five in the following week.

Accolades

Notes

References

External links
  
 
 
 
 

JTBC television dramas
Television series by JTBC Studios
Television series by Chorokbaem Media
2022 South Korean television series debuts
2022 South Korean television series endings
Korean-language Netflix exclusive international distribution programming
Television series about siblings
Television shows set in Gyeonggi Province